The 1963 Delaware Fightin' Blue Hens football team was an American football team that represented the University of Delaware during the 1963 NCAA College Division football season. The Blue Hens won every game, were declared the UPI national champion, won the Lambert Cup, and were champions of the Middle Atlantic Conference, University Division.

In its 13th season under head coach David M. Nelson, the team compiled a 8–0 record (4–0 against MAC opponents) and outscored opponents 290 to 76.

Delaware played only eight games because the season finale, against MAC University Division runner-up Bucknell, was canceled following the assassination of President John F. Kennedy. The game had been heavily hyped, as Bucknell had a 3–1 conference record and could force a championship tie by winning. Initially, Bucknell announced the game would be played, but late on Friday night – after most other conferences and colleges had decided to cancel their games, but too late to catch the Blue Hens before they arrived in Western Pennsylvania – they reversed that decision. Bucknell offered Delaware the option to make up the game after Thanksgiving, but Delaware coach Dave Nelson declined, saying waiting that long, and playing a football game with a national tragedy so fresh in everyone's memory, would be "anticlimactic".

After the season, Delaware was named by the United Press International as the national small college football  champion. Delaware outranked No. 2 Northern Illinois, receiving 18 first place votes (and 309 points) from the coaches to eight (and 285 points) for Northern Illinois. The Associated Press (AP), on the other hand, ranked Northern Illinois No. 1 (63 points) and Delaware No. 2 (53 points).

Delaware halfback Mike Brown was selected by the AP as a first-team player on its 1963 All East team as well as its 1963 Little All-American football team. Brown led the team and the MAC with 78 points scored (48 in MAC games) and 838 rushing yards (434 in MAC games). Due to the cancellation of the Bucknell game, Brown fell 36 yards short of the school's single-season rushing record.

Paul Chesmore was Delaware's team captain. Other key players included quarterback Chuck Zolak.

On October 5, 1963, the Hens established a Middle Atlantic Conference record with 505 yards of total offense. They eclipsed that record one week later with 596 yards against Lafayette.

The team played its home games at Delaware Stadium in Newark, Delaware.

Schedule

References

Delaware
Delaware Fightin' Blue Hens football seasons
College football undefeated seasons
NCAA Small College Football Champions
Delaware Fightin' Blue Hens football